This article displays the squads of the teams that competed in 2020 FIBA Women's Olympic Qualifying Tournaments. Each team consists of 12 players.

Ostend

Belgium

Canada

Japan

Sweden

|}
| valign="top" |
 Head coach

 Assistant coaches

Legend
Club – describes lastclub before the tournament
Age – describes ageon 6 February 2020
Source fiba.com
|}

Bourges

Australia

Brazil

France

Puerto Rico

Belgrade – Group A

Mozambique

Nigeria

Serbia

United States

Belgrade – Group B

China

Great Britain

|}
| valign="top" |
 Head coach

 Assistant coaches

Legend
Club – describes lastclub before the tournament
Age – describes ageon 6 February 2020
Source fiba.com
|}

South Korea

Spain
}

References

Women's Olympic basketball squads